Hager is an unincorporated community in Lincoln County, in the U.S. state of West Virginia.

History
A post office called Hager was established in 1906. Edward Hager, an early postmaster, gave the community his name.

References

Unincorporated communities in Lincoln County, West Virginia
Unincorporated communities in West Virginia